Magazin BIT is a Montenegrin monthly magazine.

It started out in 2006 as the first Montenegrin ICT magazine. In September 2009 it celebrated three years of publishing, thus entering its fourth year as only IT technologies oriented paper magazine in Montenegro, with stable sources of funding and thousands of readers and subscribers.

Magazine was published by NVO "Udruženje za popularizaciju informacionih i komunikacionih tehnologija u Crnoj Gori" (English: Association for Popularization of Information and Communication Technologies in Montenegro), based in Montenegrin Capital City Podgorica.

References

 ICT Magazin BIT Official website

BIT, Magazine